Mohammad Kalantor is a Bangladeshi art director. He won Bangladesh National Film Award for Best Art Direction five times for the films Dui Bodhu Ek Swami (2003), Hajar Bachhor Dhore (2005), Megher Koley Rod (2008), Gangajatra (2009), Raja Surja Khan (2012).

Selected films
 Dui Bodhu Ek Swami (2003)
 Dui Noyoner Alo (2005)
 Hajar Bachhor Dhore (2005)
 Ek Takar Bou (2008)
 Megher Koley Rod (2008)
 Gangajatra (2009)
 Raja Surja Khan (2012)

Awards and nominations
National Film Awards

References

External links
 

Best Art Direction National Film Award (Bangladesh) winners
Bangladeshi art directors
Year of birth missing (living people)
Living people